South Gloucestershire Council is the local authority of South Gloucestershire, England, covering an area to the north of the city of Bristol. As a unitary authority it has the powers of a non-metropolitan county and district council combined. It is administratively separate from the county of Gloucestershire. 

The council area elects 61 councillors from 28 wards. Following the May 2019 local elections, South Gloucestershire Council comprises 33 Conservative councillors, 17 Liberal Democrat councillors and 11 Labour councillors. The leader of the council is Toby Savage, a Conservative, who has held the post since May 2018. The chief executive is Dave Perry, appointed on 12 December 2018.

Powers and functions 

The local authority derives its powers and functions from the Local Government Act 1972 and subsequent legislation. For the purposes of local government, South Gloucestershire is a non-metropolitan area of England. As a unitary authority, South Gloucestershire Council has the powers and functions of both a non-metropolitan county and district council combined. In its capacity as a district council it is a billing authority collecting Council Tax and business rates, it processes local planning applications, and is responsible for housing, waste collection and environmental health. In its capacity as a county council, it is a local education authority, responsible for social services, libraries and waste disposal.

South Gloucestershire Council is a member of the West of England Combined Authority.

See also
 South Gloucestershire Council elections

References

External links 
 

Unitary authority councils of England
Local education authorities in England
Local authorities in Gloucestershire
Leader and cabinet executives
Billing authorities in England
Politics of South Gloucestershire District